Caroline Amelia Nation (November 25, 1846June 9, 1911), often referred to by Carrie, Carry Nation, Carrie A. Nation, or Hatchet Granny, was a radical member of the temperance movement, which opposed alcohol before the advent of Prohibition. Nation is noted for attacking alcohol-serving establishments (most often taverns) with a hatchet.

Nation was also concerned about tight clothing for women; she refused to wear a corset and urged women not to wear them because of their harmful effects on vital organs. She described herself as "a bulldog running along at the feet of Jesus, barking at what He doesn't like", and claimed a divine ordination to promote temperance by destroying bars.

Early life and first marriage
Caroline Amelia Moore was born in Garrard County, Kentucky, to George Moore and Mary Campbell. Her father was a successful farmer, stock trader, and slaveholder of Irish descent. During much of her early life, Moore's health was poor and her family experienced financial setbacks. The family moved several times in Kentucky and finally settled in Belton, Missouri, in 1854. 

In addition to their financial difficulties, many of Moore's family members suffered from mental illness, her mother at times having delusions. There is speculation that the family did not stay in one place long because of rumors about Mary Moore's mental state. Some writers have speculated that Mary believed she was Queen Victoria because of her finery and social airs. Mary lived in an insane asylum in Nevada, Missouri, from August 1890 until her death on September 28, 1893. Mary was put in the asylum through legal action by her son, Charles, although there is suspicion that Charles instigated the lawsuit because he owed Mary money.

The family moved to Texas as Missouri became involved in the Civil War in 1862. George did not fare well in Texas, and he moved his family back to Missouri. The family returned to High Grove Farm in Cass County. When the Union Army ordered them to evacuate their farm, they moved to Kansas City. Carrie nursed wounded soldiers after a raid on Independence, Missouri. The family again returned to their farm when the Civil War ended.

In 1865, Moore met Charles Gloyd, a young physician who had fought for the Union, who was a severe alcoholic. Gloyd taught school near the Moores' farm while deciding where to establish his medical practice. He eventually settled on Holden, Missouri, and asked Moore to marry him. Moore's parents objected to the union because they believed he was addicted to alcohol, but the marriage proceeded. They were married on November 21, 1867, and separated shortly before the birth of their daughter, Charlien, on September 27, 1868. Gloyd died in 1869 of alcoholism.

Influenced by the death of her husband, Carrie Gloyd developed a passionate activism against alcohol. With the proceeds from selling her inherited land (as well as that of her husband's estate), she built a small house in Holden. Gloyd moved there with her mother-in-law and Charlien, and attended the Normal Institute in Warrensburg, Missouri, earning her teaching certificate in July 1872. Gloyd taught at a school in Holden for four years. She obtained a history degree and studied the influence of Greek philosophers on American politics.

Second marriage and "call from God"

In 1874, Gloyd married David A. Nation, an attorney, minister, newspaper journalist, and father, 19 years her senior.

The family purchased a 1,700 acre (690 ha) cotton plantation on the San Bernard River in Brazoria County, Texas. As neither knew much about farming, the venture was ultimately unsuccessful. David Nation moved to Brazoria to practice law. In about 1880, Carrie Nation moved to Columbia (now East Columbia) to operate the hotel owned by A. R. and Jesse W. Park. Her name is on the roll of Columbia Methodist Church in West Columbia. She lived at the hotel with her daughter, Charlien Gloyd, "Mother Gloyd" (Carrie's first mother-in-law), and David's daughter, Lola. Carrie Nation's husband also operated a saddle shop just southwest of this site. The family soon moved to Richmond, Texas, to operate a hotel.

David Nation became involved in the Jaybird–Woodpecker War. As a result, he was forced to move back north to Medicine Lodge, Kansas, in 1889, where he found work preaching at a Christian church and Carrie ran a successful hotel.

Carrie Nation began her temperance work in Medicine Lodge by starting a local branch of the Woman's Christian Temperance Union and campaigning for the enforcement of Kansas' ban on the sale of liquor. Her methods escalated from simple protests to serenading saloon patrons with hymns accompanied by a hand organ, to greeting bartenders with pointed remarks such as, "Good morning, destroyer of men's souls." She also helped her mother and her daughter who had mental health problems.

Dissatisfied with the results of her efforts, Nation began to pray to God for direction. On June 5, 1900, she felt she received her answer in the form of a heavenly vision. As Nation described it:The next morning I was awakened by a voice which seemed to me speaking in my heart, these words, "GO TO KIOWA," and my hands were lifted and thrown down and the words, "I'LL STAND BY YOU." The words, "Go to Kiowa," were spoken in a murmuring, musical tone, low and soft, but "I'll stand by you," was very clear, positive and emphatic. I was impressed with a great inspiration, the interpretation was very plain, it was this: "Take something in your hands, and throw at these places in Kiowa and smash them."

Responding to the revelation, Nation gathered several rocks – "smashers", she called them – and proceeded to Dobson's Saloon on June 7. Announcing "Men, I have come to save you from a drunkard's fate", she began to destroy the saloon's stock with her cache of rocks. After she similarly destroyed two other saloons in Kiowa, a tornado hit eastern Kansas, which Nation took as divine approval of her actions.

"Hatchetations"
Nation continued her destructive ways in Kansas, her fame spreading through her growing arrest record. After she led a raid in Wichita, Kansas, Nation's husband joked that she should use a hatchet next time for maximum damage. Nation replied, "That is the most sensible thing you have said since I married you." The couple divorced in 1901; they had no children. Between 1902 and 1906, she lived in Guthrie, Oklahoma.

Alone or accompanied by hymn-singing women, Nation would march into a bar and sing and pray while smashing bar fixtures and stock with a hatchet. Between 1900 and 1910, she was arrested some 30 times for "hatchetations", as she came to call them. Nation paid her jail fines from lecture-tour fees and sales of stick pins in the shape of hatchets. The souvenirs were provided by a Topeka, Kansas, pharmacist. Engraved on the handle of the hatchet, the pin reads, "Death to Rum".

In April 1901, Nation went to Kansas City, Missouri, a city known for its wide opposition to the temperance movement, and smashed liquor in various bars on 12th Street in downtown Kansas City. She was arrested, taken to court, and fined  although the judge suspended the fine under the condition that she never return to Kansas City. She was arrested over 32 times—one report is that she was placed in the Washington, D.C., poorhouse for three days for refusing to pay a $35 fine.

Nation also conducted women's rights marches in Topeka, Kansas. She led hundreds of women that were part of the Home Defender's Army to march in opposition to saloons.

In Amarillo, Texas, she received a strong response, as she was sponsored by the surveyor W. D. Twichell, an active Methodist layman.

Later life and death

Nation's anti-alcohol activities became widely known, with the slogan "All Nations Welcome But Carrie" becoming a bar-room staple. She published The Smasher's Mail, a biweekly newsletter, and The Hatchet, a newspaper.

Suspicious that President William McKinley was a secret drinker, Nation applauded his 1901 assassination because drinkers "got what they deserved".

Later in life Nation exploited her name by appearing in vaudeville in the United States and music halls in Great Britain. Nation, a proud woman more given to sermonizing than entertaining, found these venues uninspiring for her proselytizing. One of a number of pre-World War I acts that "failed to click" with foreign audiences, Nation was struck by an egg thrown by an audience member during one 1909 music hall lecture at the Canterbury Theatre of Varieties in Westminster, London. Indignantly, "The Anti-Souse Queen" ripped up her contract and returned to the United States. Seeking profits elsewhere, Nation sold photographs of herself, collected lecture fees, and marketed miniature souvenir hatchets. In October 1909, various press outlets reported that Nation claimed to have invented an aeroplane.

Near the end of her life, Nation moved to Eureka Springs, Arkansas, where she founded the home known as "Hatchet Hall". In poor health, she collapsed during a speech in a Eureka Springs park, after proclaiming, "I have done what I could." Nation was taken to a hospital in Leavenworth, Kansas, the Evergreen Place Hospital and Sanitarium located on 25 acres at Limit Street and South Maple Avenue just outside the city limits of Leavenworth. Evergreen Place Hospital was founded and operated by Dr. Charles Goddard, a professor at the University of Kansas School of Medicine and a distinguished authority on nervous and mental troubles, liquor and drug habits. Nation died there on June 9, 1911. She is buried in the southeastern side of Belton Cemetery in Belton, Missouri. The Woman's Christian Temperance Union later erected a stone inscribed "Faithful to the Cause of Prohibition, She Hath Done What She Could" and the name "Carry A. Nation".

Legacy
In 1918, a drinking fountain was erected in Nation's memory by the Woman's Christian Temperance Union. It is located at Naftzger Memorial Park in Wichita, Kansas. One myth is that the fountain was nearly destroyed at one time by a beer truck hitting it; Jamie Tracy, a curator of the Wichita-Sedgwick County Historical Museum, has not found any evidence for this ironic tale.

Nation's home in Medicine Lodge, Kansas, the Carrie Nation House, was bought by the Woman's Christian Temperance Union in the 1950s and was declared a U.S. National Historic Landmark in 1976. 

In 1977 Gary Dahl, inventor of the Pet Rock, used his proceeds from that fad to renovate and open a bar in Los Gatos, California which he jokingly named "Carrie Nation's Saloon."

In July 2018 a life-size bronze statue of Nation was erected in front of the Eaton Hotel (at the time called the Carey Hotel), the location of her raid in Wichita, Kansas.

Carry A. Nation House in Kentucky was a home of Carrie Nation, and was a 10-room house then. It is now listed on the National Register of Historic Places in Garrard County, Kentucky, United States.  It was built in 1846.

A spring just across the street from Hatchet Hall in Eureka Springs, the Carrie Nation Spring, is named after her.

Humanitarian works 
Carrie Nation was known as "Mother Nature" for the charity and religious work she did.
Because Nation believed drunkenness was a cause to many problems in society, she attempted to help those in prison.
In 1890, Nation founded a sewing circle in Medicine Lodge, Kansas to make clothing for the poor as well as prepare meals for them on holidays like Thanksgiving and Christmas. 
In 1901, Nation established a shelter for wives and children of alcoholics in Kansas City, Missouri. This shelter would later be described as an "early model for today's battered women's shelter".

In media 

 Nation is portrayed by Valerie Buhagiar in Season 9 Episode 6 of the Canadian TV series Murdoch Mysteries.
 In "Bar Fights" (Episode 3, Season 4) of Comedy Central's Drunk History, Nation is portrayed by Vanessa Bayer.
 In the movie Beyond the Valley of the Dolls the band the Kelly Affair changes the band name to the Carrie Nations.
 A fictionalized version of Nation is portrayed in the musical Queen of the Mist, wherein she crosses paths with Annie Edson Taylor. Nation was portrayed by Julia Murney in the original Off-Broadway production.
 Carrie Nation is present as a loa in the short story "Black Glass" written by Karen Joy Fowler
 In the classic TV series The Honeymooners, when Ralph Kramden’s wife Alice, played by Audrey Meadows, discovers that Kramden’s newly acquired wealth consisted solely of counterfeit money, Kramden defends his spendthrift ways. He begins by exclaiming “Are you done with all your lectures, Carrie Nation?”

Notes

References

Further reading

The Use and Need of the Life of Carry A. Nation (1905) by Carry A. Nation
Carry Nation (1929) by Herbert Asbury
Cyclone Carry: The Story of Carry Nation (1962) by Carleton Beals
Vessel of Wrath: The Life and Times of Carry Nation (1966) by Robert Lewis Taylor
Carry A. Nation: Retelling The Life (2001) by Fran Grace

External links

Photos, letters, and other primary sources related to Carry Nation –  Kansas Memory, the digital portal of the Kansas Historical Society
Carrie Amelia Moore Nation (1846–1911) – The Encyclopedia of Arkansas History & Culture
Carry A. Nation: The Famous and Original Bar Room Smasher – Kansas State Historical Society
Photos of Carry Nation – Fort Bend Museum, hosted by the Portal to Texas History
 
 
Carry Nation's hammer, Kansas Museum of History
Carry Nation's purse, Kansas Museum of History

1846 births
1911 deaths
19th-century American criminals
American female criminals
American suffragists
American temperance activists
Kansas Prohibitionists
People from Garrard County, Kentucky
Prohibition in the United States
Woman's Christian Temperance Union people
Vaudeville performers
Activists from Kansas